James Francis Murphy may refer to:
Frank Murphy (public servant) (1893–1949), Australian public servant
Jim Murphy (born 1967), Scottish politician

See also
Francis Murphy (disambiguation)
James Francis (disambiguation)
James Murphy (disambiguation)